Namukku Parkkan is a 2012 Malayalam film directed by Aji John, starring Anoop Menon and Meghna Raj in the lead roles. Jayasurya plays a pivotal guest appearance, while Mohanlal makes a vocal appearance in the film.

Plot
Namukku Parkkan reflects the realities of a middle class Malayali family. Rajeev is a veterinary surgeon and his wife Renuka is a primary school teacher. They have two school-going daughters. They live in a small house and doesn't have a proper bathroom, one day somebody peeps in when meghana was bathing. They lead a happy and contended life, but they have a dream and that is to own a house. They have plans for their ideal house, a house merging with nature, with lots of trees and a lovely garden and cattle roaming the compound. But the dream is beyond their means. All others in their family own houses. But Rajeev and family still live in a rented house. On top of that, Rajeev has been served with a note to vacate the house. He has asked for some grace period till he finds a new house. Then an unexpected incident in his life makes it inevitable for him to build a house. He sets out on a journey to own a house and the realities he encounters in his journey form the rest of the story. C.I. Velu Nagarajan a Karnataka police officer residing in Kerala "helps" Rajeev and rest of the story is of the other incidents he faces.

Cast

Reception
The music rights of movie was obtained by Sathyam Audios for a record price close to 13 lakh, which is the highest price in Malayalam film industry, beating the previous record of Urumi. Movie as a whole was rated as average by Sify and Rediff review with rediff calling Anoop Menon's acting impressive.

References

2010s Malayalam-language films
Films directed by Aji John